Waterloo City Council is the governing body for the city of Waterloo, Ontario, Canada.

The council consists of the Mayor of Waterloo and 7 ward councillors.

Current Waterloo City Council

Mayor, Dorothy McCabe
Southwest Ward 1 Councillor, Sandra Hanmer
Northwest Ward 2 Councillor, Royce Bodaly
Lakeshore Ward 3 Councillor, Hans Roach
Northeast Ward 4 Councillor, Diane Freeman
Southeast Ward 5 Councillor, Jen Vasic
Central-Columbia Ward 6 Councillor, Mary Lou Roe
Uptown Ward 7 Councillor, Julie Wright

See also
List of mayors of Waterloo, Ontario

References

External links
 Waterloo City Council

Municipal councils in Ontario
Politics of Waterloo, Ontario